is a Japanese alpine skier. He competed in three events at the 1960 Winter Olympics.

References

1935 births
Living people
Japanese male alpine skiers
Olympic alpine skiers of Japan
Alpine skiers at the 1960 Winter Olympics
Sportspeople from Hokkaido